Chesen Frey (born October 28, 1973) is an American cyclist from the United States Virgin Islands. He competed in the individual road race at the 1992 Summer Olympics. In 2003, he was banned by the United States Anti-Doping Agency for two years, after testing positive for high levels of testosterone.

References

External links
 

1973 births
Living people
United States Virgin Islands male cyclists
Olympic cyclists of the United States Virgin Islands
Cyclists at the 1992 Summer Olympics
Place of birth missing (living people)
Competitors at the 2002 Central American and Caribbean Games